Zdeněk Pičman (23 January 1933 – 6 July 2014) was a Czech football player who competed in the 1964 Summer Olympics. He was born in Příbram.

References

External links
 
 
 Biography of Zdeněk Pičman 

1933 births
2014 deaths
Czechoslovak footballers
Czechoslovakia international footballers
Olympic footballers of Czechoslovakia
Olympic silver medalists for Czechoslovakia
Olympic medalists in football
Footballers at the 1964 Summer Olympics
Medalists at the 1964 Summer Olympics
Sportspeople from Příbram
SK Slavia Prague players
FC Hradec Králové players
Association football defenders
Czech footballers